Kuttappuzha is a village in Thiruvalla taluk, Pathanamthitta district in the state of Kerala, India. It is part of Thiruvalla Municipality.

Politics

Kuttappuzha is a part of Pathanamthitta Loksabha constituency. Mr. Anto Antony is the current Member of Parliament of the constituency.

Weather

The climate of the place is moderate and pleasant. Tropical climate is prevailed here throughout the year.

References 

Villages in Pathanamthitta district
Villages in Thiruvalla taluk